These are the late night schedules for the four United States broadcast networks that offer programming during this time period, from September 2009 to August 2010. All times are Eastern or Pacific. Affiliates will fill non-network schedule with local, syndicated, or paid programming. Affiliates also have the option to preempt or delay network programming at their discretion.

Legend

Schedule

Monday-Friday

Note: As the result of the Tonight Show conflict, O'Brien was let go at NBC, with his version of The Tonight Show ending on January 22, 2010. Jay Leno returned on March 1, 2010. O'Brien returned to late night in the Fall of 2010, with Conan airing on TBS.

Saturday

By network

ABC

Returning series
ABC World News Now
America This Morning
Jimmy Kimmel Live!
Nightline

CBS

Returning series
CBS Morning News
Late Show with David Letterman
The Late Late Show with Craig Ferguson
Up to the Minute

Fox

New series
Brothers 
Encore Programming
Sit Down, Shut Up
The Wanda Sykes Show

Not returning from 2008-09:
MADtv (revived by The CW in 2015-16)
Talkshow with Spike Feresten

NBC

Returning series
Early Today
Last Call with Carson Daly
Late Night with Jimmy Fallon
Poker After Dark
Saturday Night Live
The Tonight Show with Conan O'Brien
The Tonight Show with Jay Leno

Not returning from 2008-09:
Late Night with Conan O'Brien

References
TV Listings

United States late night network television schedules
2009 in American television
2010 in American television